Pappas or Papas is a Greek surname, which means "priest" (occupational surname). In the United States, it is often a shortened form of a longer surname like Papadopoulos or Papageorgiou. The genitive form, Pappa or Papa, is used by women. Notable individuals with this surname include:

Alexi Pappas (born 1990), Greek American long-distance runner
Alexis Pappas (1915–2010), Norwegian chemist
Arthur Pappas, Australian rugby player
Athena Papas, American dental science scholar
Charilaos Pappas (born 1983), Greek soccer player
Charles Herach Papas (1918–2007), American applied physicist and electrical engineer
Chris Pappas (politician), U.S. Representative
Christopher Pappas, South African politician and member of the KwaZulu-Natal Legislature
DeAnna Pappas (born 1981), American TV Personality
Diane Pappas (born 1971), Democratic member of the Illinois House of Representatives 
Doug Pappas (1962–2004), American baseball expert
Emmanouel Pappas (1772–1821), leader in the Greek War of Independence from the Ottoman Empire
Erik Pappas (born 1966), American baseball player
George Pappas (born 1942), American epistemologist and professor of philosophy
George Pappas (bowler) (born 1947), American professional bowler
Gregory Fernando Pappas (born 1960), American philosopher
Irene Papas (1929-2022), Greek actress and singer
Jared Pappas-Kelley, American filmmaker and publisher
Leonidas Pappas (born 1967), Greek wrestler
Manolis Pappas (born 1951), Greek soccer player
Michael Papas, Greek-Cypriot independent filmmaker
Michael James Pappas (born 1960), American politician from New Jersey
Milt Pappas (1939–2016), American baseball player
Natalia Pappas, Scientist, Psychologist 
Nick Pappas, Australian solicitor (lawyer) active in the South Sydney Rabbitohs Rugby League
Nikolaos Pappas (1930–2013), Greek admiral
Nikos Pappas (basketball) (born 1990), Greek basketball player
Nikos Pappas (politician), Greek politician
Robin Pappas, American actress
Sophocles Papas (1893 or 1894–1986), Greek classical guitar pedagogue and music publisher. 
Tas Pappas (born 1975), Australian skateboarder
Tasos Pappas (born 1984), Greek soccer player
Theodore Pappas, executive editor of the Encyclopædia Britannica
Thomas Pappas (born 1959), United States Army officer involved in the Abu Ghraib scandal
Tom Pappas (born 1976), American track and field decathlete
William "Bill" Papas (1927–2000), South African political cartoonist and caricaturist

See also
Pappas Restaurants, American restaurant chain based in Texas
Pappas Telecasting Companies, broadcasting companies based in California
Emmanouil Pappas (municipality), municipality in the Serres Prefecture, Greece
Thomas J. Pappas School, schools based in Arizona
Breakfast at Pappa's, 1998 English punk rock album

Notes

Greek-language surnames
Surnames
Occupational surnames

de:Pappasel
el:Παππάς
fr:Pappas
it:Pappas
ru:Паппас
uk:Паппас